Fleischmannia obscurifolia is a species of flowering plant in the family Asteraceae. It is found in Ecuador and Colombia. Its natural habitats are subtropical or tropical moist lowland forests and subtropical or tropical moist montane forests. It is threatened by habitat loss.

References

obscurifolia
Flora of Ecuador
Least concern plants
Taxonomy articles created by Polbot